The Jubilee Garden is a large, open park big area in the center of Vadodara city, Gujarat, India.

References 

Rajkot
Parks in India
Tourist attractions in Rajkot district